Confederation Park may refer to:

Canada
 Confederation Park, Burnaby
 Confederation Park, Calgary
 Confederation Park, a municipal park and marina in front of Kingston City Hall (Ontario)
 Confederation Park, Saskatoon, subdivision of Saskatoon, Saskatchewan

See also
Confederation Square